Periglischrodes is a genus of mites in the family Spinturnicidae.

References

Mesostigmata
Articles created by Qbugbot